The 1951 election of the Speaker of the  House of Commons  occurred on 31 October 1951, following the 1951 general election and the retirement of the previous speaker Douglas Clifton Brown. The election resulted in the election of Conservative MP William Morrison. This was one of the few speaker elections held in the 20th century in which there was more than one nominee (the others including 1971 and 1992), and the first contested election of speaker since 10 April 1895.

Nominated candidates

 William Morrison (Conservative)
 Major James Milner (Labour)

Election

The election was conducted by means of a conventional parliamentary motion, originally to elect Morrison. He was proposed by Sir Hugh O'Neill and seconded by Sir Ralph Glyn.

Samuel Viant then moved an amendment to the original motion to elect James Milner, who was then seconded by David Logan.

Both Morrison and Milner then gave their speeches of submission to the will of the House.

Results

MPs voted on the motion that Morrison take the chair as speaker, which was approved by 318 votes to 251. Morrison was then conducted to the chair by O'Neill and Glyn.

References

 House of Commons transcript, 31 October 1951

Speaker of the British House of Commons election
1951
Speaker of the British House of Commons election